Daniel Flores (born May 11, 2003) is an American professional soccer player who plays as a left-back for Guadalajara.

Club career
Flores joined the academy at Real Salt Lake in 2018. He made his professional debut for the club's reserve team, Real Monarchs, on September 30, 2020 against New Mexico United. He started as Real Monarchs were defeated 0–1.

Career statistics

Club

References

2003 births
Living people
American soccer players
Association football defenders
Real Monarchs players
USL Championship players
Soccer players from Arizona